The University of Minnesota Morris (UMN–Morris) is a public liberal arts college in Morris, Minnesota. It is part of the University of Minnesota system and was founded in 1960 as a public, co-educational, residential liberal arts college offering Bachelor of Arts degrees.

History

Although UMN Morris officially opened its doors in 1960, the history of what became the current institution reaches to 1887. That year, the first building of the Morris Industrial School for Indians, an American Indian boarding school founded by Mother Mary Joseph Lynch, was constructed on the site and run by the Roman Catholic Sisters of Mercy under contract to the US government. Beginning in 1898, the Office of Indian Affairs (today's Bureau of Indian Affairs) took over operations to introduce a more progressive curriculum. The school closed in 1909, under a congressionally authorized program to reduce the number of boarding schools in preference for locating schools on reservations, so that families and communities would not be broken up. The campus was transferred to the State of Minnesota under the agreement that American Indians would always be admitted free of tuition; the current UMN Morris still follows this policy.

In 1910 the University of Minnesota established a coeducational residential high school on the campus called the West Central School of Agriculture (WCSA). This was one of four such schools established by the university in outstate Minnesota to provide agricultural and home economics education to rural youth. The complex also included an agricultural research station. The WCSA operated for half a century, but declining enrollment in the late 1950s prompted the University of Minnesota to phase out its regional agricultural schools. The residents of the Morris region convinced the university to develop the campus as four-year college. The University of Minnesota Morris opened in September 1960, phasing in college classes year by year while phasing out the last high school class, which graduated in 1963.

The only surviving building from the Morris Industrial School for Indians, an 1899 dormitory, was listed on the National Register of Historic Places in 1984. The oldest building on campus, it now serves as UMN Morris's Multi-Ethnic Resource Center. In 2003 a historic district consisting of the dormitory and 10 buildings from the WCSA period was listed on the National Register as the West Central School of Agriculture and Experiment Station Historic District. It was listed for having national significance in the themes of agriculture and education. The district was nominated for being an excellent example of a residential agricultural high school, one of the longest running in the nation and one of the most intact. It was also a significant component of the University of Minnesota's nationally influential system of such facilities, and an important contributor to education and agriculture in west-central Minnesota.

The WCSA campus buildings were mostly designed by state architect Clarence H. Johnston Sr. in American Craftsman style and built in the 1910s and 20s. The 11 contributing properties of the historic district consist of the Music Hall (1899, previously the Indian School boys' dormitory and now the Multi-Ethnic Resource Center), the Girls' Dormitory (1912, now Camden Hall), Spooner Hall (1912–13), the Cattle Barn (1914, now the Saddle Club Barn), the Engineering Building (1915, now the Welcome Center), the Dining Hall (1918, now Behmler Hall), Senior Hall (1920, now Blakely Hall), Agricultural Hall (1920–21, now John Q. Imholte Hall), the Infirmary (1923–24, now the Education Building), Junior Hall (1926, now Pine Hall), and the Seed House (1929).

Academics
Morris offers 35 majors and 32 minors, 13 education licensure areas, and nine pre-professional programs in education, the humanities, science and mathematics, and the social sciences.

According to U.S. News & World Report, the five most popular majors on campus are Psychology, General; English Language and Literature, General; Biology/Biological Sciences, General; Business Administration and Management, General; and Economics, General.

In 2018, U.S. News & World Report ranked UMN Morris 155th in the "National Liberal Arts Colleges" list and #7 in "Top Public Schools" for Liberal Arts Colleges. Washington Monthly ranked UMN Morris the #36 "Best Bang for Your Buck" school in 2014.

Music
The music discipline provides performing opportunities such as choir, symphonic winds, jazz ensembles, orchestra, and recitals.

The annual jazz festival was founded by Jim "Doc" Carlson in 1979. World-renowned jazz artists are invited to host clinics and master classes for high school, community, and college jazz ensemble. Each night of the festival concludes with performances by student jazz combos, ensembles, and the guest artists backed by Morris Jazz I.

Green campus

Morris is one of the first public colleges to generate on-site renewable power from local resources, such as corn stover. At the south edge of campus, a biomass gasification plant—fueled by crop residues from nearby farms—generates steam. The biomass gasifier is part of an integrated system for heating and cooling campus buildings. The combined heat and power system includes a steam turbine, which generates renewable electricity from gasifier steam, and a steam—powered absorption chiller.

At the campus's Regional Fitness Center, locally manufactured solar thermal panels collect the sun's energy to heat swimming pool water. A solar photovoltaic system on the south side of the science building converts sunlight into electricity. On the glacial ridge overlooking the campus, two 1.65 megawatt wind turbines generate renewable electricity for the campus and the region. Shifting to renewable power is just one piece of the campus's comprehensive sustainability strategy. Other measures include historic building reuse, green building design and construction, conservation, local foods programs, hybrid vehicles, innovative curriculum, and community outreach.

In August 2013 the University of Minnesota Morris opened the Green Prairie Living and Learning Community. Construction on the building began in December 2012. The building is designed to house 72 students including 4 community advisors and a hall director. The building will house students during summer for special events and camps. There are kitchen facilities, a central lounge and patio, and study space. The Green Prairie Living and Learning Community was designed to meet Minnesota B3 sustainability guidelines and LEED Gold certification. It is constructed with high thermal mass insulated concrete forms (ICF) to prevent winter heat loss and summer heat gain. This is the first Residence Hall on the Morris campus to have suites.

In 2019, UMN Morris was ranked as the #1 campus in the United States for most renewable electricity generated on campus per full-time equivalent (FTE) student by Environment America.

Athletics

Minnesota–Morris (UMM) athletic teams are the Cougars. The university is a member of the Division III level of the National Collegiate Athletic Association (NCAA), primarily competing in the Upper Midwest Athletic Conference (UMAC) since the 2003–04 academic year. The Cougars previously competed in the Northern Sun Intercollegiate Conference (NSIC) of the NCAA Division II ranks from 1966–67 to 2002–03.

Minnesota–Morris competes in 17 intercollegiate varsity sports: Men's sports include baseball, basketball, cross country, football, golf, soccer, tennis and track & field; while women's sports include basketball, cross country, golf, soccer, softball, swimming & diving, tennis, track & field and volleyball.

History
UMN Morris's athletic teams have experienced varied success during the school's history. The 1970s were marked by success in basketball and football. Olympic wrestler, Dennis Koslowski, wrestled for the Cougars in the early 1980s. In the early 1990s as a non-scholarship Division II, Cougar athletics found a more appropriate home in the UMAC of NCAA Division III. They are the first member of the UMAC to be a public, state-supported institution – all other members over the years were private institutions, usually with a religious affiliation.

In 1993, UMN Morris was the first college in the United States to sponsor women's wrestling as an official varsity sport. The wrestling programs were cut in 2003 due to budget constraints. In 2006, a new men's soccer team was announced.

Football
In 2006, UMN Morris opened a new football stadium named Big Cat Stadium, just south of the school's Regional Fitness Center. BCS is also used by the Morris Area High School Tigers. The new stadium replaced Cougar Field which had been used from 1970 to 2005. The school's first football field, named Miller Field, was used from 1961 to 1969.

In 2006, the Minnesota Morris Cougars football team captured their first UMAC championship in the Hubert H. Humphry Metrodome signaling the end of coach Ken Crandall's coaching career at UMNM. The last conference title for the Cougar football program was the Northern Intercollegiate Conference (NIC) title in 1987, the second of two straight NIC titles. Over the next three years, the Cougars suffered losing records under coach Todd Hickman. In 2010, the team overcame their preseason rating (tied for last) to end the season with a winning record (5–4) and ending in a three-way tie for 3rd in the conference. 2016 record (4-6) 2017 record (6-4), undefeated at home.

Media
University students operate the radio station "the U-90 alternative, the prairie's only alternative" 89.7 FM (KUMM). The university produces a television program that airs on PBS stations in the state. Pioneer Public Television carries Prairie Yard and Garden. UMN Morris also has a student-run publication: The University Register, a newspaper which is published weekly.

Residence halls
The residence halls on campus are:
Clayton A. Gay Hall (Gay Hall) – Underclassmen Residence Hall. Also home to Student Health Services and the Office of Residential Life (ORL).
David C. Johnson Independence Hall (Indy Hall) – Underclassmen Residence Hall
Pine Hall – Underclassmen Residence Hall
Blakely Hall – Upperclassmen Residence Hall (inactive during the 2013–2014 year)
Spooner Hall – Upperclassmen Residence Hall
On-Campus Apartments – Upperclassmen Apartment Housing
Green Prairie Living and Learning Community – Underclassmen and Upperclassmen Residence Hall and Suites

Notable people

Alumni
Lorie Skjerven Gildea 1983 – Chief Justice for Minnesota Supreme Court
Matt Little - Former Mayor of Lakeville, and Minnesota State Senator
Earl B. Olson 1932 – Founder and Chairman of Jennie-O Turkey Company
Sara McMann (attended 1998–1999) – 2004 Olympic Silver Medalist in women's freestyle wrestling; currently a professional mixed martial arts fighter, competing in the Women's UFC bantamweight division
Dennis Koslowski 1981 – team chiropractor, Minnesota Vikings. Owner, Koslowski Chiropractic Inc.
Cy Thao 1995 – State of Minnesota House of Representatives
Dana Veth 2006 – Bahamian footballer
Joseph Ruud, better known by his ring name, Erick Rowan – professional wrestler, formerly signed by the WWE.
Rachel Brand - former Associate Attorney General of the United States

Faculty
PZ Myers – Associate professor of biology, prominent atheist blogger
John Stuart Ingle – Artist
Vicente Cabrera Funes – Author

See also

 List of colleges and universities in Minnesota
 Higher education in Minnesota

Notes

References

External links
 
 Official athletics website

 
1960 establishments in Minnesota
American Craftsman architecture in Minnesota
Buildings and structures in Stevens County, Minnesota
Education in Stevens County, Minnesota
Minnesota Morris
University of Minnesota Morris
National Register of Historic Places in Stevens County, Minnesota
School buildings on the National Register of Historic Places in Minnesota
Public universities and colleges in Minnesota
Public liberal arts colleges in the United States